Clifford Ernest Mason (27 November 1929 – August 2013) was an English professional footballer who played as a left back for Darlington, Sheffield United, Leeds United, Scunthorpe United and Chesterfield in the 1950s and 1960s.

Playing career
Mason was born in York. He began his professional career at Sunderland, but never represented them in the Football League, and moved on to Darlington in July 1952. He made 107 League appearances over three seasons, and then joined Sheffield United for 1955–56, where he became captain and made 97 appearances in six seasons. Leeds United manager Don Revie signed Mason, aged 31, during the 1961–62 season for £10,000 as an experienced defender who was needed during a troubled season for Leeds when they were fighting relegation to the Third Division. He appeared in the last eleven games of the season and made a further 22 appearances in the next, a total of 33 League and 2 League Cup matches, before Grenville Hair regained the left back spot. Mason joined Scunthorpe United for the 1963–64 season and joined Chesterfield for the following season. Mason died in August 2013 at the age of 83.

References

1929 births
2013 deaths
Footballers from York
English footballers
Association football fullbacks
Sunderland A.F.C. players
Darlington F.C. players
Leeds United F.C. players
Scunthorpe United F.C. players
Chesterfield F.C. players
English Football League players
Sheffield United F.C. players